JProfiler is a commercially licensed Java profiling tool developed by ej-technologies GmbH, targeted at Java EE and Java SE applications.

Reviews

External links
 

Profilers